The Last of Us is an American post-apocalyptic drama television series created by Craig Mazin and Neil Druckmann for HBO. Based on the 2013 video game developed by Naughty Dog, the series is set in 2023, twenty years into a pandemic caused by a mass fungal infection, which forces its hosts to transform into zombie-like creatures and collapses society. The series follows Joel (Pedro Pascal), a smuggler tasked with escorting the teenage Ellie (Bella Ramsey) across a post-apocalyptic United States.

Guest stars include Nico Parker as Joel's daughter Sarah, Merle Dandridge as resistance leader Marlene, Anna Torv as Joel's partner Tess, Gabriel Luna as Joel's brother Tommy, Lamar Johnson and Keivonn Montreal Woodard as brothers Henry and Sam, and Melanie Lynskey and Jeffrey Pierce as resistance leader Kathleen and her second-in-command Perry.

The Last of Us was filmed throughout Alberta from July 2021 to June 2022. It is the first HBO series based on a video game, and is a joint production by Sony Pictures Television, PlayStation Productions, Naughty Dog, the Mighty Mint, and Word Games. Druckmann, who wrote and co-directed the original game, assisted Mazin with scriptwriting for the nine episodes of the first season. The score was composed by Gustavo Santaolalla, who composed for the game, and David Fleming.

The Last of Us premiered on January 15, 2023. It received acclaim from critics, who praised the performances, writing, production design, and score; several called it the best adaptation of a video game. Across linear channels and HBO Max, the series premiere was watched by 4.7 million viewers on the first day—the second-biggest for HBO since 2010—and almost 40 million within two months; by March, the first six episodes averaged over 30 million viewers. In January 2023, the series was renewed for a second season.

Cast and characters

Main 

 Pedro Pascal as Joel, a hardened middle-aged survivor who is tormented by the trauma of his past. Joel is tasked with smuggling a young girl, Ellie, out of a quarantine zone and across the United States. Unlike in the games, which required Joel (as the player character) to perform near-superhuman actions for the player to progress, he is more vulnerable in the serieshe is hard of hearing in one ear due to a gunshot and his knees ache when he stands. Pascal became available for a new series after the release of the second season of The Mandalorian, attracting several offers for projects from large networks, of which he chose The Last of Us, partly to work with co-creator Craig Mazin. Mazin and co-creator Neil Druckmann had been considering Pascal for some time. He accepted the role within 24 hours; The Mandalorian producers gave Pascal permission to work on the series. He is reportedly earning $600,000 per episode, making him one of the highest-paid American television stars. Pascal was chosen for his ability to portray a tough, tortured, and vulnerable character who suppresses his emotions until necessary. A non-gamer, Pascal watched his nephew play the beginning of the first game because he lacked the skill to play it himself; he found Joel to be "so impressive" but was concerned about imitating the games too closely, instead choosing to "create a healthy distance" and allow the showrunners to decide the characterization. Pascal based Joel's voice on his own experiences growing up in San Antonio, Texas, paring it back from the Southern accent used in the game. In the video games, Joel is portrayed by Troy Baker.
 Bella Ramsey as Ellie, a 14-year-old girl who displays much defiance and anger but has a private need for kinship and belonging. She has not lost her playfulness, bonding easily with children, and has a fondness for puns. She is immune to the Cordyceps infection and may be the key to creating a vaccine. In keeping with the games, she is a lesbian. Around 105 actors had been considered for Ellie; the producers sought a performer who could portray a resourceful, quirky, and potentially violent character. After watching Ramsey's audition tape, they spoke to David Benioff and D. B. Weiss—showrunners of Game of Thrones, in which Ramsey had a recurring role—who assured them of her talent. Ramsey secured the role less than a month after her audition. She received news of her casting during production on a different project. She said the show feels "like the biggest thing [she has] ever done" and was immediately comforted Pascal would perform alongside her for the entire experience. Ramsey was aware of the game before her audition, but was encouraged not to play it to avoid replicating the original performance, instead watching some gameplay on YouTube to "get a sense of it"; she still had not played it after filming the series. Ramsey wanted her performance to be reminiscent of the games without copying them. Ramsey, who is English, learned an American accent for the role, and had to cut off over 15 inches of hair. She wore a chest binder for 90 percent of production for better focus on set. In the video games, Ellie is played by Ashley Johnson.

Guest 

 Nico Parker as Sarah, Joel's 14-year-old daughter. Parker watched videos of the game years before getting the role. She wanted to "stay away from the game version" and provide her own interpretation of the character; she felt intimidated at the prospect of portraying Sarah's death due to its impact in the game. Pascal felt an instant bond with Parker, with whom he filmed scenes first. In the first game, Sarah is played by Hana Hayes.
 John Hannah as Dr. Newman, an epidemiologist who issues a warning about the threat of fungi during a talk show in 1968.
 Merle Dandridge as Marlene, the head of the Fireflies, a resistance movement hoping to gain freedom from the military. Dandridge reprises her role from the video games; Mazin and Druckmann felt, unlike most other actors from the game, she physically resembled her character, only requiring a wig. Dandridge revisited the game in preparation. She was consistently surprised by the physical elements on set, having only portrayed Marlene within a motion capture stage and suit during the games. She found the character had "a heavier stillness" in the show, which she attributed to the weight of living in the post-apocalyptic world.
 Josh Brener as Murray, the host of a talk show in 1968. The concept of the talk show was inspired by Dick Cavett and his long-running series The Dick Cavett Show.
 Christopher Heyerdahl as Dr. Schoenheist, an epidemiologist on the 1968 talk show who is skeptical of Newman's warning.
 Brendan Fletcher as Robert, a thug and black market arms dealer in the Boston Quarantine Zone. In the first game, Robert is played by Robin Atkin Downes.
 Anna Torv as Tess, a hardened survivor and Joel's smuggler partner. Torv and Pascal decided Tess and Joel had been lovers for some time but, like in the game, were subtle about their relationship. She felt her performance required consistent truthfulness due to its subtlety. Torv was aware of the games but had not played them; she watched the cutscenes after her casting. Casting director Victoria Thomas noted several actors were discussed for the role but "no one quite fit"; she felt Torv was able to portray the necessary toughness and heart. In the first game, Tess was played by Annie Wersching.
 Gabriel Luna as Tommy, Joel's younger brother and a former soldier who maintains idealism in his hope for a better world. About a month after the casting of Pascal and Ramsey, Luna was asked to submit an audition tape; he performed one scene from the game and one from the first episode. He was familiar with the work of Mazin and executive producer Carolyn Strauss, and had previously worked with HBO on True Detective. Six days after submitting his tape, he was offered the role by Mazin, Strauss, and Druckmann; according to Luna, they instantly knew he was "the one". He was enthusiastic for the role, having lived in Austin, Texas—Joel and Tommy's hometown—around the same time as the show's setting, and was given a PlayStation 5 during production to play the games as research. He provided input for Tommy's costume, such as the Texan plant Indian paintbrush on his boots and his First Nations-crafted belt buckle, which he felt Tommy "found and treasured because it was just so well-made". Luna believed Tommy desires a family like his brother's and a world in which people can return to peaceful living. He could relate to Joel's actions as an older brother, particularly as he had been the patriarch of his own family alongside his single mother. Luna partly took inspiration from Texans such as Willie Nelson and Kris Kristofferson, particularly Kristofferson for his relaxed attitude. In the video games, Tommy is played by Jeffrey Pierce.

 Christine Hakim as Ratna Pertiwi, a mycology professor at the University of Indonesia who advises the government to bomb Jakarta to slow the spread of the infection. Hakim was contacted for the series via Instagram. She was initially hesitant to accept the role as she was caring for her mother and husband amid the COVID-19 pandemic but was convinced by her grandniece, a fan of the game. She brought her traditional batik scarves and Indonesian jewelry, which the costume department accepted for use in the series.

 Nick Offerman as Bill, a survivalist who lives with Frank. Con O'Neill was initially cast in the role, but was forced to drop out due to scheduling conflicts. Mazin wanted gay men to play Frank and Bill, but after O'Neill's departure, he was drawn to casting Offerman at the suggestion of executive producer Carolyn Strauss. He felt inspired to cast a comedic actor like Offerman because "funny people have soul", citing performances like Bryan Cranston in Breaking Bad and Bob Odenkirk in Better Call Saul. A scheduling conflict originally prohibited Offerman from accepting the role but he decided to take it after his wife Megan Mullally read the script; he felt attached to the material and found a kinship with Bill due to his experience in crafting. In the first game, Bill is played by W. Earl Brown.
 Murray Bartlett as Frank, a survivalist living in an isolated town with Bill. Bartlett was unfamiliar with the source material but was drawn to the show after he read the script. He researched the game after receiving the role and found it cinematic, citing the characters, narrative, and themes. Frank is seen briefly in the first game as a corpse, but has no dialogue. Druckmann expected some fans to be upset by Frank's inclusion in the show due to the divergence from the game's narrative.

 Lamar Johnson as Henry Burrell, who is hiding from a revolutionary movement in Kansas City with his younger brother Sam. Johnson had played the game and wanted to avoid imitating the original performance, noting it had impacted him when playing. He was nervous about the role due to the character's importance in the games, but found his nervousness prompted him to challenge himself. He began learning American Sign Language via Zoom shortly after arriving in Calgary, and spent his time away from set learning. He did not want viewers to think his knowledge of the language was fake, and considered his performance important for deaf representation. In the first game, Henry is played by Brandon Scott, and his scenes take place in Pittsburgh.
 Melanie Lynskey as Kathleen Coghlan, the leader of a revolutionary movement in Kansas City. Kathleen is an original character created by Mazin as the leader of a group of hunters who appeared in the game. Mazin compared Kathleen to Madame Defarge from Charles Dickens's A Tale of Two Cities (1859): a revolutionary who becomes terroristic due to cruel circumstances, which allows the audience to empathize. Mazin, who was friends with Lynskey, reached out to her about the role, describing her as "a war criminal". She was initially hesitant until Mazin pitched more about the character, describing her as someone who was forced into a role after the death of her brother, who "was basically Jesus". Mazin and Druckmann felt her casting was unusual as she has a "sweetness" that conflicts with Kathleen's position in the episode, an intentional decision to intrigue the audience; Lynskey wanted to play the character as "soft spoken and delicate" to juxtapose her violence.
 Keivonn Montreal Woodard as Sam, a deaf, artistic eight-year-old child who is hunted by violent revolutionaries alongside his brother Henry. Woodard, who is deaf, was one of around five actors to audition for Sam; it was his first acting role. Sam's age was reduced from the game to allow him to look up to Ellie; Mazin felt this justified his revelation of his bite to Ellie, which does not occur in the game. In portraying Sam's bravery, Woodard recalled his own experiences of being told to stay brave after his father died. In the first game, a thirteen-year-old Sam is played by Nadji Jeter.
 Jeffrey Pierce as Perry, a revolutionary rebel in a quarantine zone who is Kathleen's right-hand man. Pierce previously portrayed Tommy in the video games. He reached out to Druckmann to offer his support for the series and "was lucky that something came up that fit". Perry is an original character in the show who, according to Pierce, "has huge implications for things" that occurred in the game. The script described him as a former military member. Pierce played the role akin to a rōnin from an Akira Kurosawa film and found his death was an honorable "samurai death" sacrificing himself to protect the woman he loves.
 John Getz as Eldelstein, a Kansas City doctor who protects Henry and Sam from Kathleen and the revolutionary rebels.

 Rutina Wesley as Maria, a leading member of a collectivist settlement in Jackson, Wyoming and Tommy's pregnant wife. Wesley researched the game to "capture the essence" of Maria but wanted to avoid replicating it; she found it "terrifying" to play a pre-established character but wanted to add her "energy on it". She appreciated Maria's calmness as a leader and observed she was a person who only smiles with her eyes; she thought Maria naturally entered a leadership role due to her history as an assistant district attorney. In the games, Maria is played by Ashley Scott.
 Graham Greene as Marlon, a Native American hunter who has lived with his wife Florence in the wilderness of Wyoming since before the pandemic. Marlon is an original character for the television series. Mazin felt, like other pairings in the show, Marlon and Florence echoed parts of Joel and Ellie's relationship.
 Elaine Miles as Florence, who lives with her husband Marlon. Florence is an original character.

 Storm Reid as Riley Abel, an orphaned girl who is Ellie's best friend at military school in post-apocalyptic Boston. Reid was unfamiliar with the game prior to her casting; when approached to star in the show, she asked family and friends for their opinions on the game. She watched snippets of gameplay to understand the emotion, but otherwise avoided the game to ensure an original take on the role; she wanted to "hone in on" the manner in which Riley moves and "took up space". Reid worked on the series for about a month. Riley originally appeared in a downloadable content pack for the first game, The Last of Us: Left Behind, in which she is portrayed by Yaani King.

 Scott Shepherd as David, a preacher who is the leader of a cannibalistic cult. Druckmann felt the series allowed a deeper look into the character's complexities than the game; he and Mazin wanted to humanize David in his initial interactions with Ellie, before revealing more of his true actions when he slaps a young girl. Druckmann found David's goal of producing offspring through violence representative of some organized religions, and Mazin noted his goal to "secure a future" reflective of the ideologies of white supremacists. In the first game, David is played by Nolan North.
 Troy Baker as James, a senior member of a group of settlers. Baker previously portrayed Joel in the video games, while James was played by Reuben Langdon in the first game. Mazin and Druckmann considered Baker's inclusion in the series important. Upon being approached by Mazin and Druckmann, Baker did not initially remember James from the games; he expected a small role but was surprised by the character's significance upon reading the script. Baker did not want to portray James as a villain but as someone with truth and empathy, reflected in his inability to shoot Ellie when prompted. He felt James was likely preparing to enter law enforcement when the outbreak occurred, supporting his experience with weaponry and demonstrations of morality.

 Ashley Johnson as Anna, Ellie's mother, a lone pregnant woman forced to give birth under frightening circumstances. Johnson previously portrayed Ellie in the video games. Druckmann was unable to explore Anna's story in the games but considered it personally important to include in the series; after the game's release, he wrote a short story about Anna, which was later intended to be adapted into an animated short film or released as downloadable content but "it fell apart". Mazin found the story "gorgeous" and upsetting and demanded its inclusion in the series. Mazin and Druckmann simultaneously thought of casting Johnson; they considered her inclusion important due to her relationship with the games. Johnson cried after Druckmann offered her the role via text. She watched some of Ramsey's performance to match her mannerisms as Anna, and watched videos of natural births to prepare for the role. She recreated an in-game letter from Anna to Ellie and kept it in her pocket as a reminder of the character's origins.

Episodes

Production

Development 

A film adaptation of Naughty Dog's 2013 video game The Last of Us was announced in March 2014, to be written by the game's writer and creative director Neil Druckmann; it had entered development hell by 2016, and the partnership ended and rights relinquished by 2019. Due to the extensive development of a film based on Uncharted, another game series by Naughty Dog, Druckmann ensured specific plot points were included when negotiating a deal with film and television studios; he felt more closely connected to The Last of Uss creation and development than Uncharteds and always wanted to be involved in its adaptation in some manner. In 2018, writer and director Craig Mazin was approached by PlayStation Productions with a list of video games for potential television adaptation; he was disappointed to discover The Last of Us was being adapted into a film at the time as he felt television was a better fit. A fan of the video game, having played it about twelve times, Mazin was introduced to Druckmann through Shannon Woodward, a mutual friend, in 2019. Druckmann, a fan of Mazin's series Chernobyl, agreed with Mazin that The Last of Us required the length and pacing of a television series. They pitched the series to HBO about a week after meeting.

In March 2020, a television adaptation was announced in the planning stages at HBO, expected to cover events of the first game. Mazin and Druckmann were named to write and executive produce the series, while television producer Carolyn Strauss and Naughty Dog president Evan Wells were named executive producers, and Gustavo Santaolalla, who worked on the games, the show's composer. The show was announced as a joint production of Sony Pictures Television, PlayStation Productions, and Naughty Dog; it is the first show produced by PlayStation Productions. It is produced under the company name Bear and Pear Productions. Johan Renck, Mazin's collaborator on Chernobyl, was announced as executive producer and director of the series premiere in June 2020; he dropped out by November due to scheduling conflicts as a result of the COVID-19 pandemic. HBO greenlit the series on November 20. PlayStation Productions's Asad Qizilbash and Carter Swan were named executive producers, and Word Games a production company.

In January 2021, the Mighty Mint joined production, and Kantemir Balagov was announced as the pilot episode's director. He had been interested in adapting the game for years and was set to direct several opening episodes; in October 2022, Balagov said he left the project a year prior due to creative differences. Rose Lam was added as executive producer in February 2021. Pre-production in Calgary, Alberta, began on March 15; Mazin arrived in May. Ali Abbasi and Jasmila Žbanić were announced as directors in April. In July 2021, the Directors Guild of Canada revealed Peter Hoar was assigned to direct, followed in August by Mazin, in September by Druckmann, and in January 2022 by Liza Johnson and Jeremy Webb. In February, Druckmann confirmed he directed an episode and felt his experience reinforced and reflected his experience in directing games. After several months traveling between Calgary and Los Angeles, Druckmann struggled to fulfil obligations at Naughty Dog and returned home to advise remotely, feeling confident in Mazin. The season's original ten-episode count was reduced to nine during production; the first two were combined after HBO executives felt the first would not compel viewers to return.

Canadian artists union IATSE 212 claimed the production led to a 30 percent increase in union membership and employment. The first season covers the events of the first game and its downloadable expansion The Last of Us: Left Behind (2014); Druckmann and Mazin suggested a second season would immediately cover the sequel, The Last of Us Part II (2020), to avoid filler; PartII is expected to span the course of multiple seasons. He does not want the series to overtake the games. The writers ensured characters remained true to their developments in Part II in case the show received more seasons. On January 27, 2023, less than two weeks after the series premiere, HBO renewed the series for a second season. A writers' room for the second season was established in Los Angeles by February.

Casting 

Casting took place virtually through Zoom due to the COVID-19 pandemic. Casting director Victoria Thomas wanted to honor the game without being limited by it. Mazin and Thomas sought high-profile guest stars; Thomas said many of the actors "don't usually do one-episode guest spots". On February 10, 2021, Pascal and Ramsey were cast as Joel and Ellie. Earlier that day, it was reported Mahershala Ali was offered the role of Joel after Matthew McConaughey turned it down; The Hollywood Reporter noted Ali "did circle a role" in the show, but a deal was never formed. Any actresses considered for Ellie for the canceled film adaptation—such as Maisie Williams and Kaitlyn Dever—had aged out of consideration by the time the series was in production, resulting in a reset of candidates. The producers primarily sought actors who could embody Joel and Ellie individually as well as imitate their relationship. Though both were previously featured on HBO's Game of Thrones, Pascal and Ramsey had not met before the filming of The Last of Us began but found they had instant chemistry, which developed over the course of production.

Luna's casting as Tommy was announced on April 15, 2021, and Dandridge was confirmed to reprise her role of Marlene from the video games on May 27. In May, Classic Casting circulated a casting call for extras from Calgary, Fort Macleod, High River, and Lethbridge; anyone over 18 could apply, and those with vehicles from 1995 to 2003 were recommended. It was announced Parker was cast as Sarah on June 30. Pierce, Bartlett, and O'Neill's casting as Perry, Frank, and Bill was announced on July 15, followed by Torv's as Tess on July 22. On December 5, 2021, Bartlett claimed Offerman would appear on the show in a role close to his; two days later, Offerman was announced to be playing Bill, replacing O'Neill who was forced to drop out due to scheduling conflicts. On December 9, Žbanić revealed the casting of Greene, Miles, and Wesley.

Reid's casting as Riley Abel was announced on January 14, 2022. In February, Mazin distributed a casting call for a boy aged 8–14 who is deaf, black, and proficient in American Sign Language or Black American Sign Language; Deaf West Theatre confirmed this was for the character of Sam, who will appear in two episodes filmed in March and April. In June, Druckmann announced Baker and Ashley Johnson would star in the series; their character names were revealed in December. Lamar Johnson and Woodard's casting as Henry and Sam was announced in August, alongside the official announcement of Greene and Miles as Marlon and Florence. Lynskey's casting as Kathleen was announced alongside the teaser trailer in September, while Shepherd's casting was revealed in the first trailer in December. Wesley's role as Maria was announced on January 9.

Writing 
A post-apocalyptic drama and thriller, the series was written by Mazin and Druckmann; Mazin wrote all episodes except the premiere and finale, which he co-wrote with Druckmann, and the seventh episode, written by Druckmann. Druckmann was convinced Mazin was the ideal creative partner for the series after witnessing his passion for the game's story; Druckmann referred to Mazin as the story's "co-parent". Mazin said the series may represent a paradigm shift for film and television adaptations of video games due to the strength of the narrative, noting "it would only take [HBO executives] 20 minutes on Google to realize The Last of Us is the Lawrence of Arabia of video game narratives".

Druckmann felt the most important element of adapting the game was to "keep the soul", particularly the character relationships, whereas the gameplay and action sequences were of minimal importance. Mazin said the changes were "designed to fill things out and expand, not to undo, but rather to enhance". He said the series would avoid episodic storylines, such as random encounters not present in the original story. Content cut from the game was added to the show, including the story of Ellie's mother, Anna, which Mazin found "gorgeous" and demanded its inclusion in the series. Druckmann said some scripts borrow dialogue directly from the game, while others deviate; some of the game's action-heavy sequences were changed to focus on character drama at the encouragement of HBO. Druckmann said the series was taking the opposite approach to adaptation than the film Uncharted (2022); while Uncharted tells a new story with moments from the games to give "an Uncharted flavor", The Last of Us is a closer adaptation, allowing alterations such as changing character perspectives in a manner unachievable in an immersive game. Unlike creating the games, Druckmann felt he was able to "unplug" from the characters when writing the show due to the immersive nature of video games. The writers found the series an opportunity to delve into backstories of characters who the game otherwise ignored, wanting to better understand their motivations.

Druckmann was open to changing any aspects of the games but always wanted a strong reason, ensuring he and Mazin considered the impacts on events later in the narrative. The game's outbreak takes place in 2013, while its post-apocalyptic narrative occurs in 2033; this was changed to 2003 and 2023, as the writers felt the story taking place simultaneously with the show's release was more interesting and real, and did not fundamentally change the story. The writers added the outbreak's origins to the series to ground the narrative; following COVID-19, they recognized audiences are more knowledgeable about viral pandemics than they once were. Borrowing from an approach he had used in writing Chernobyl, Mazin began the series with a segment of a fictional 1960s talk show explaining the origins of a fungal infection, implying humanity knew of the potential risk for some time. For the show, the writers removed spores as the vector through which the infection is spread in the games, replacing it with tendrils that form a unified, interconnected network, inspired by the idea of mycelium. The writers felt the game's gas masks did not translate well into television and spores were not a realistic threat, and found replacing it with an interconnected network increased tension. Visually, the fungal infection was inspired by jellyfish stings after Žbanić sent an image to Mazin during preproduction. The writers avoided making "a zombie show", acknowledging the infected creatures were ultimately a vessel through which the characters are pressured to make interesting decisions and reveal their true selves.

Filming 

Supervising location manager Jason Nolan began preparation work for the series in January 2021, leading a 115-person team that found and transformed more than 180 locations. Due to the COVID-19 pandemic, cast and crew quarantined for two weeks after entering Canada. Ksenia Sereda worked as cinematographer alongside Balagov, Mazin, Druckmann, and Johnson, Eben Bolter with Hoar and Webb, Christine A. Maier with Žbanić, and Nadim Carlsen with Abbasi. Sereda used an Alexa Mini with Cooke Optics S4 lenses; Bolter used the same as he felt it was effective for handheld shots while emulating 35 mm film. The series filmed for 200 days, with around 18–19 days per episode, amounting to 2–3 pages of script per day.

Filming began in Calgary, Alberta, on July 12, a week later than originally scheduled. It moved to High River and Fort Macleod throughout the month—replicating Austin, Texas, for the first episode—before moving to Calgary in August. Balagov's work completed production by August 30, and Hoar's on October 5. Around  was spent for a four-day shoot in Downtown Edmonton in October, including at Rice Howard Way and the Alberta Legislature Building. Filming took place in downtown Calgary and Beltline later in October. Druckmann's episode was completed by November 7. In November, production occurred in Canmore, Alberta, replicating Jackson, Wyoming, and at Mount Royal University and the Southern Alberta Institute of Technology. Žbanić's episode completed production by December 9.

In January 2022, Northland Village Mall in northwest Calgary was decorated for production. Filming took place in Okotoks and Waterton Lakes National Park in February, and Airport Trail in northeast Calgary saw closures for three days in March. Webb's episodes entered production in March 2022 and continued until the end of principal photography in June. Calgary was used to replicate Kansas City, Missouri in March. Production continued in Calgary in April and May, including around the Calgary Courts Centre, Kensington, and Victoria Park. Reshoots for Texas scenes took place in Olds in late May and early June, and High River in June. Production concluded in the early hours of June 11, two days later than originally scheduled; Additional photography took place in Kansas City on October 4.

Music 

Santaolalla and David Fleming composed the score for the television series; the former wrote its opening theme. He said Latino viewers "will recognize touches" of his music, and drew on his experiences in film and television, having composed the themes and some tracks for Jane the Virgin (2014–2019) and Making a Murderer (2015–2018). He primarily recrafted his previous work instead of creating new music, focusing on elements he found interesting. Fleming's work was inspired by real-world sounds within a decayed civilization. A 66-track soundtrack album for the series was released digitally on February 27.

The first episode uses songs like "Tomorrow" by Avril Lavigne and "White Flag" by Dido to foreshadow Sarah's fate and Joel's character arc. Its final scene and credits feature the song "Never Let Me Down Again" by Depeche Mode, which Mazin chose due to its blend of upbeat sounds and dark lyrics; the song returned in the sixth episode, performed by Mazin's daughter Jessica, to demonstrate Ellie feeling let down by Joel. The third episode uses "Long, Long Time" by Linda Ronstadt, which exhibits themes of unfulfilled love and how time heals wounds, echoing Bill and Frank's relationship. Streams of the song increased significantly following the episode's broadcast; several outlets compared it to the 2022 resurgence of Kate Bush's "Running Up That Hill" after its use in the fourth season of Stranger Things.

The fourth episode's title references the lyrics of "Alone and Forsaken" by Hank Williams, which is used in the episode; it was previously used in the original game and one of its trailers, and a trailer for the television series. The seventh episode features "All or None" by Pearl Jam to represent Ellie's loneliness and uncomfortability, reuses Etta James's version of "I Got You Babe" from The Last of Us: Left Behind as its romantic lyrics hidden by joyous music mirrored the feelings of Ellie and Riley, and uses A-ha's "Take On Me" to reflect their feelings towards each other and illustrate Ellie's journey; a cover version of "Take On Me" was used in a trailer for the series, and Ellie performs the song in The Last of Us Part II.

Design 
The production team included five art directors and hundreds of technicians. The game's art director, concept artists, and environment artists provided feedback on costumes and sets. Costume designer Cynthia Ann Summers found the series more difficult than outfit-focused media like fantasy or period pieces as the costumes had to be integral to the story without standing out. She ensured Joel's outfits demonstrated a lack of consideration, as he would place little thought into his appearance; Mazin demanded specific colours. Summers required around 30 duplicates of each outfit to account for elements like blood and dirt progression, stunt doubles, and reserves. The breakdown department, responsible for disfiguring outfits as required by the story, was led by Sage Lovett. At the request of Mazin, Summers and her team focused on minor details relevant to an apocalyptic setting, like shoelaces replacing belts. Pascal and Ramsey were happy to wear regular outfits as they had both worked on science-fiction and period pieces.

Production designer John Paino referenced the video game but focused on references used by Naughty Dog during development. He created an image collage which included a photograph of reassembled chairs, which Mazin considered the show's mandate: "the built world is unbuilt and rebuilt". Paino found several Canadian towns had similarities to American architecture, particularly Texas. He was unable to locate empty and abandoned buildings or location imitating Boston's brick-lined streets for the first two episodes, requiring manual transformation and constructions. Paino and his team constructed the Boston quarantine zone near Stampede Park over several months for the first episode, the town of Lincoln in around six to twelve weeks for the third, and the Kansas City cul-de-sac in nine weeks for the fifth.

Barrie and Sarah Gower, with whom Mazin had worked on Chernobyl, were engaged to create the prosthetics for the infected. Barrie Gower appreciated the series avoided "stereotypical zombies—the pronounced cheekbones, sunken eyes, lots of blood and gore". The production team created a large reference library for "fuzz, slime mold, shelf mushrooms, button mushrooms, different textures and colors". Mazin wanted the clickers to resemble the in-game design through prosthetics; he felt using visual effects would have lessened their impact. Their team found themselves continually referring to the original concept art from the game. For the approximately 70 actors portraying the infected mob in the fifth episode, 70 artists applied prosthetics to about 30 people in each three-hour shift. The  bloater suit was coated in an gel-like liquid during filming to appear wet and reflective. Paul Becker and Terry Notary choreographed the series. Notary wanted the creatures' movements to imitate each other, akin to schools of fish; for the fifth episode, he set up a boot camp to prepare the actors for the role.

Post-production 
The series was edited by Timothy A. Good and Emily Mendez; Mark Hartzell edited the second episode, and Cindy Mollo edited the eighth. After Mazin worked on Chernobyl, Good expressed interest in collaborating; the two had been friends for some time. A different editor was employed for The Last of Us but departed due to scheduling conflicts; Good joined the series after finishing work on the third season of The Umbrella Academy. Mendez worked on the third episode as Good's assistant editor; he showed her work to Mazin, and they agreed for Mendez to co-edit the seventh episode as it adapted Left Behind, her favorite part of the games. She continued as Good's co-editor for the fifth, sixth, and ninth episodes. Good chose not to play the game and let the dailies instruct his emotional instincts; Mendez and Mazin gave him details when necessary. Mendez was tasked with the temporary sound design, using her own library and sound effects from the game. Good used Santaolalla's soundtrack from the game as the temp score during editing and found it influenced his decisions.

Sixteen visual effects teams worked on the series, supervised by Alex Wang. The season averaged around 250 visual effects shots per episode. The 650-person team at DNEG worked on 535 shots for the series over 18 months, primarily focusing on environmental effects, including the scenes set in Boston, Kansas City, Jackson, and Salt Lake City; field trips were conducted to gather resources, and the team regularly referenced the video games. The visual effects teams consulted with Naughty Dog's concept artists when creating the infected, and used timelapse videos of Cordyceps growth as animation references. All studios worked on the fifth episode's action sequence; the episode had around 350 to 400 visual effects shots. Wētā FX created the infected effects; 50 to 70 creatures were digitally added to the horde. Design studio Elastic created the show's title sequence to demonstrate the "unrelenting nature" of the fungus; creative directors Andy Hall and Nadia Tzuo researched fungi to ensure an accurate depiction and movement. They pitched several ideas to Mazin and Druckmann before settling on the realistic depiction; Mazin enjoyed the idea of the fungus appearing beautiful despite its destructive nature.

Release and promotion 

For The Last of Us Day on September 26, 2021, HBO shared the first image of Pascal and Ramsey in costume, followed by the first still from the series at Summer Game Fest on June 10, 2022. The first footage of the show was revealed in a HBO Max trailer during the premiere of House of the Dragon on August 21, featuring Pascal, Ramsey, Parker, and Offerman. The decision to develop The Last of Us Part I—a remake of the original game—was partly based on the potential to introduce show viewers to the games; it was released for PlayStation 5 in September 2022, and is set to release for Windows in March 2023. The first teaser trailer for the show was released for The Last of Us Day on September 26, 2022, featuring the first footage of Luna, Dandridge, Torv, and Reid, and confirming Lynskey's casting; the teaser, which used Hank William's "Alone and Forsaken", received over 17 million views in less than 24 hours across Twitter and YouTube.

While the series was originally indicated to begin airing in 2022, HBO and HBO Max chief content officer Casey Bloys denied this in February 2022 and clarified it would begin in 2023, which was confirmed in the first teaser trailer. Following leaks from Sky and HBO Max, on November 2, 2022, HBO announced the series would premiere in the United States on January 15, 2023, and released the first official poster. The first season was broadcast on HBO in the United States, and is available to stream in 4K resolution on HBO Max; it was released on Binge in Australia, Crave in Canada, HBO Go and Now TV in Hong Kong, Disney+ Hotstar in India, U-NEXT in Japan, Neon in New Zealand, HBO Go in Southeast Asia and Taiwan, and Sky Group channels and Now in Germany and Austria, Italy, Switzerland, and the United Kingdom and Ireland. The first episode received its red carpet world premiere in Westwood, Los Angeles on January 9, followed by theater screenings in Budapest and Sydney on January 11, and New York City on January 12. Behind-the-scenes videos, titled Inside the Episode, were released on HBO Max and YouTube following each episode's airing.

A short clip of Joel and Ellie hiding from a Clicker was released on November 16 to tease the show's appearance at CCXP the following month. Posters for eleven characters were released on November 30. Dandridge, Druckmann, Luna, Mazin, Pascal, and Ramsey appeared on a panel at CCXP on December 3, where the first full trailer was released, revealing the first appearances of Baker, Ashley Johnson, and Shepherd. Baker, Ashley Johnson, Pascal, and Ramsey presented at The Game Awards 2022 on December 8. HBO announced Baker would host a companion podcast alongside the series, featuring Mazin and Druckmann. In January 2023, Pascal and Ramsey were featured on the cover of The Hollywood Reporter, while Pascal was on the cover of Wired. HBO released the first behind-the-scenes featurette on January 6, and several press outlets published interviews with cast and crew based on roundtable discussions from the previous month. Ramsey appeared on Jimmy Kimmel Live! alongside a clip from the series on January 9, and on The Late Late Show with James Corden on January 10. A season trailer was released after the airing of the first episode on January 15, and a two-hour trial of The Last of Us Part I was made available for PlayStation Plus Premium members.

Google released an Easter egg in late January, adding mushrooms to the screen when searching for The Last of Us or Cordyceps. On January 27, the first episode was released for free on HBO Max in the United States, and on Sky's YouTube channel in the United Kingdom. To promote the third episode, Bartlett appeared on The Late Show with Stephen Colbert on January 30, and Offerman on Jimmy Kimmel Live! on February 1. Pascal appeared on The Tonight Show Starring Jimmy Fallon on February 2, and hosted Saturday Night Live on February 4; a viral skit from the latter featured Pascal portraying Mario in a "prestige drama" based on the Mario Kart series inspired by HBO's The Last of Us. Pascal appeared on Late Night with Seth Meyers on February 15, The Graham Norton Show on February 24, and Hot Ones on March 9; the release of The Last of Us overlapped the promotion and release of The Mandalorians third season. A 31-minute special chronicling the production of the series aired on HBO after the finale on March 12. Ramsey appeared on The Jonathan Ross Show on March 18.

The first season is set to be released for purchase digitally on April 11, 2023, and physically on DVD, Blu-ray, and Ultra HD Blu-ray on July 18, containing several behind-the-scenes featurettes including the Inside the Episode series; a SteelBook version will be available in the United Kingdom.

Reception

Critical response 

On review aggregator Rotten Tomatoes, The Last of Us has an approval rating of 96% based on 455 reviews, with an average rating of 8.75/10. The website's general consensus reads, "Retaining the most addictive aspects of its beloved source material while digging deeper into the story, The Last of Us is bingeworthy TV that ranks among the all-time greatest video game adaptations." Metacritic calculated an average of 84 out of 100 based on 42 reviews, indicating "universal acclaim". Several reviewers considered it the best adaptation of a video game, with GameSpots Mark Delaney saying it "feels like the beginning of a new era" for the genre.

Reviewers praised the differences from the original game's narrative implemented by Mazin and Druckmann, and some believed the scenes lifted directly from the game were among the weakest and led to issues with pacing. Varietys Daniel D'Addario felt the show relied too heavily on action sequences, while TechRadars Axel Metz wanted more action. IGNs Simon Cardy wrote the series "often shines brightest" during its quietest moments. Critics overwhelmingly considered the third episode the season's best, and some named it among the greatest episodes of television overall. The Hollywood Reporters Daniel Fienberg felt it elevated the series to a new level, and Empires John Nugent called it "moving, surprisingly romantic, and one of the finest hours of television in recent memory". Some critics found the first episode well-made but too familiar, and /Films Valerie Ettenhofer considered it the season's weakest. RogerEbert.coms Brian Tallerico found the final two episodes rushed.

Several critics lauded the production design. Digital Spys David Opie wrote "every set feels like it was ripped straight out of the game". Conversely, Slant Magazines Pat Brown felt environments appeared too manicured and carefully placed. Inverses Dais Johnston praised the use of lighting to highlight the humanity of both the characters and creatures, and called the cinematography "something other video game adaptations could only dream of". TV Guides Keith Phipps called the series "visually striking", and IGNs Cardy wrote it "is often a sight to behold". Santaolalla's score received praise, with CNETs Sean Keane feeling it added "a yearning of sadness to the narrative".

The cast's performances received widespread acclaim, with critics singling out the chemistry between Pascal and Ramsey for praise. Evening Standards Vicky Jessop said the two "steal every scene they're in", while Rolling Stones Alan Sepinwall called them "compulsively watchable and almost instantly endearing". Empires Nugent and /Films Ettenhofer referred to Pascal's performance as the best of his career, citing his ability to portray nuance and rare vulnerability. TechRadars Metz described him as the "perfect real-world manifestation" of Joel. Several critics found Ramsey gave the show's breakout performance for her balance of comedy and emotion, with Times Judy Berman calling her "the show's greatest asset" and IGNs Cardy applauding her for "making her mark" on Ellie, a character already considered iconic long before Ramsey's portrayal. Some critics considered the seventh episode Ramsey's strongest.

Guest performances throughout the season were highly praised. For the premiere, Rolling Stones Sepinwall lauded Parker for "holding the screen" and establishing Sarah as likeable, and Push Squares Aaron Bayne wrote Luna flawlessly "slips into the role" with little screen time. Den of Geeks Bernard Boo found Torv in the second episode sophisticated and heartbreaking. Offerman and Bartlett's performances were described by Complexs William Goodman as "career-best" and by Inverses Johnston as Emmy-worthy. Lynskey's performance in the fourth and fifth episodes was praised for juxtaposing humanity and viciousness. For the fifth episode, IGNs Cardy lauded Johnson's emotional performance in his final scene, and Total Films Bradley Russell felt the naivety of Woodard's role intensified the narrative. Critics enjoyed Pascal and Luna's chemistry in the sixth episode, and Ramsey and Reid's in the seventh; Bleeding Cools Tom Chang called the latter two "award-worthy", and Push Squares Bayne felt Reid effectively captured Riley's sense of "youthful pride". The A.V. Clubs David Cote called Shepherd's performance "masterful in its wry, understated charm".

Ratings 
The premiere episode had 4.7 million viewers in the United States on its first night of availability, including linear viewers and streams on HBO Max, making it the second-largest debut for HBO since 2010, behind House of the Dragon. It was streamed for a total of 223 million minutes in its first three hours. The total viewing figure increased to over 10 million viewers after two days, 18 million after a week, 22 million within twelve days, and almost 40 million within two months. In Latin America, the series premiere was the biggest HBO Max debut ever. The second episode had 5.7 million viewers on its first night, an increase of 22 percent from the previous week, the largest second-week audience growth for an original HBO drama series in the network's history. From January 16 to 22, the series was streamed for 837 million minutes, ranking sixth for the week and outpacing House of the Dragons first two episodes in the same interval; it maintained its sixth position with 877 million the following week. By January 31, the first two episodes averaged 21.3 million viewers.

The third episode had 6.4 million viewers on its first night, a 12 percent increase. The series was streamed for 1.19 billion minutes from January 30 to February 5, ranking fourth for the week, and 1.1 billion minutes the following week, ranking third. The fourth episode had 7.5 million viewers, a 17 percent weekly increase and 60 percent increase from the first episode. By March 6, the first five episodes averaged almost 30 million viewers across linear viewers and streams; by March 12, the first six averaged 30.4 million, the highest figure for an HBO series since the eighth season of Game of Thrones, surpassing House of the Dragons ten-episode average. The fifth episode had 11.6 million viewers in its first weekend, while the sixth and seventh had 7.8 and 7.7 million viewers, respectively, on their first nights. The final two episodes had 8.1 and 8.2 million viewers, a 74 and 75 percent increase from the first.

Commercial impact 
The video games increased their sales following the premiere. In January, The Last of Us PartI was the eighth-most-downloaded PlayStation 5 game in North America and tenth in Europe; on PlayStation 4, The Last of Us PartII was the seventh-most-downloaded in both regions, while The Last of Us Remastered was thirteenth in North America and fifteenth in Europe. In February, PartI rose to sixth in North America and seventh in Europe, Remastered to ninth and seventh, respectively, in PartII to first in both regions. In the United Kingdom, in the week after the premiere, Remastered sales increased by 337 percent over the previous week and The Last of Us PartI by 305 percent, with both reentering the charts as a result. The following week, PartI saw another 32 percent increase at retail, and Remastered 27 percent. For the month, PartII sales increased 317 percent, and Remastered 285 percent. In the United States, PartI reentered the January charts at 11th, climbing 25 positions from the previous month.

Notes

References

External links 
 
 
 

TV series
2020s American drama television series
2020s American LGBT-related drama television series
2023 American television series debuts
Alternate history television series
American television shows based on video games
Deaf culture
English-language television shows
HBO original programming
Live action television shows based on video games
Nonlinear narrative television series
PlayStation Productions
Post-apocalyptic television series
Post-traumatic stress disorder in fiction
Serial drama television series
Television series about orphans
Television series by Home Box Office
Television series by Sony Pictures Television
Television series created by Craig Mazin
Television series impacted by the COVID-19 pandemic
Television series set in 1968
Television series set in 2003
Television series set in 2007
Television series set in 2010
Television series set in 2013
Television series set in 2023
Television shows filmed in Calgary
Television shows filmed in Edmonton
Television shows scored by Gustavo Santaolalla
Television shows set in Austin, Texas
Television shows set in Boston
Television shows set in Colorado
Television shows set in Kansas City, Missouri
Television shows set in Massachusetts
Television shows set in Utah
Television shows set in Wyoming
Works based on Sony Interactive Entertainment video games
Zombies in television